Ivory is the fourth studio album by L.A.-based, New Zealand alternative rock singer Gin Wigmore, named after her son. The album was released on 6 April 2018 by Island Records Australia peaking at number 11 in New Zealand. Ivory explores a heavier alternative rock sound along with a heavy blue-eyed soul vibe and doo-wop inspired ballads counting on a funky, groovy production. The lyrics of the album provide commentary on feminism, empowerment, and a return to roots.

Track listing

References

2018 albums
Gin Wigmore albums